The Battle of Varese was fought on 26 May 1859 at Varese (Lombardy). It was an engagement of the Second Italian War of Independence, fought between the Italian volunteers formation of the Hunters of the Alps, led by Giuseppe Garibaldi, against Austrian troops. The Austrian defeat allowed the movement of the Hunters towards Como, and obliged the Austrians to keep troops on the northern part of the front.

The prelude
Following the Battle of Montebello, Napoleon III and Victor Emmanuel II decided Ferenc Gyulai was tied down at the Po. The Franco-Piedmontese forces were then moved from Alessandria and then to Vercelli. This strategic flanking movement from conducted from 27 May through 29 May 1859. Cialdini's 4th Division led the advance guard, supported by Manfredo Fanti and Giovanni Durando. Achille Baraguey d'Hilliers' I Corps and MacMahon's II Corps deployed along the Po, blocking the Austrians.

On 23 May, Garibaldi took the Austrian garrison at Sesto Calende

In the meantime, on the 25 May, 500 Austrian riflemen, 130 Uhlans, and two guns from Gallarate attacked a company led by Carlo De Cristoforis at Sesto Calende, but were rejected to Somma Lombardo.

The encounter
On 26 May, Garibaldi took Varese and repelled an Austrian counterattack. Gyulai then sent Karl von Urban's force of 11,000 north. 

On the 26 May, at dawn, Urban arrived at Varese, where Garibaldi had already prepared the defence. The Italians were deployed as: one battalion (Enrico Cosenz) on the right, two battalions on the left (Giacomo Medici), one battalion in the middle (Nicola Ardoino); two reserve battalions, one at Varese (Nino Bixio), and one at the Biumo Superiore hill.

The Austrians opened fire with the guns, then moved three columns against the enemy. Cosenz's battalion attacked the incoming Austrians, and routed them into the other columns, repulsing the Austrian attack with the help of the Medici battalion. Urban, overestimating the enemy forces, retreated on Malnate. Medici and Ardoino attacked the retreating Austrians, causing more losses.

Sources

Varese
Varese 1859
Varese 1859
1859 in Italy
1859 in the Austrian Empire
May 1859 events